Bob McGuinn is a New Zealand former rugby league footballer who represented New Zealand in the 1970 World Cup.

Playing career
McGuinn played for the Point Chevalier Pirates in the Auckland Rugby League competition and also represented Auckland. In 1970 he was selected for the New Zealand national rugby league team and went on to play in two matches at the 1970 World Cup.

In 1971 McGuinn moved clubs, joining the Otahuhu Leopards. He played one more test match for the Kiwis in 1971.

References

Living people
New Zealand rugby league players
New Zealand national rugby league team players
Auckland rugby league team players
Point Chevalier Pirates players
Otahuhu Leopards players
Rugby league wingers
Year of birth missing (living people)